Lewis David Robling (born 3 October 1991) is a Wales Under-20 international rugby union player. Robling plays for Blackheath having progressed through the academy team at Dragons and previously played for Newport RFC. His usual position is Fly Half or Centre.

Robling made his debut for Newport Gwent Dragons versus Glasgow on 7 October 2011. He scored his first try for the Dragons in the 21–20 win against the Ospreys 6 January 2012.

In April 2014 Robling signed for English Championship club Jersey Reds.

On 14 April 2017, Robling signed for Championship rivals Ealing Trailfinders for the 2017–18 season.

On 16 May 2018 Robling signed for another Championship rival, Bedford Blues, for the 2018–19 season.

He joined National League 1 side Blackheath ahead of the 2020–21 season.

Personal
Lewis Robling is the Grandson of the former BBC commentator Idwal Robling who was part of the Great Britain football squad for the 1952 Summer Olympic Games in Helsinki.

References

External links
 Newport Gwent Dragons profile
 Wales profile

1991 births
Living people
Caerleon RFC players
Dragons RFC players
Jersey Reds players
Newport RFC players
Rugby union players from Caerleon
Welsh rugby union players
Rugby union fly-halves
Rugby union centres